Heteropaussus is a genus of beetles in the family Carabidae, containing the following species:

 Heteropaussus allardi (Raffray, 1886) 
 Heteropaussus alternans (Westwood, 1850) 
 Heteropaussus angolensis Luna De Carvalho, 1959 
 Heteropaussus basilewskyi (Luna De Carvalho, 1951) 
 Heteropaussus brevicornis (Wasmann, 1904) 
 Heteropaussus bruecklei Nagel, 1982 
 Heteropaussus cardonii (Gestro, 1901) 
 Heteropaussus corintae Luna De Carvalho, 1958 
 Heteropaussus curvidens (Reichensperger, 1938) 
 Heteropaussus dohrni (Ritsema, 1875) 
 Heteropaussus ferranti (Reichensperger, 1925) 
 Heteropaussus flavolineatus (Kraatz, 1899) 
 Heteropaussus hastatus (Westwood, 1850) 
 Heteropaussus jeanneli (Reichensperger, 1938) 
 Heteropaussus kivuensis Luna De Carvalho, 1965 
 Heteropaussus laticornis (H.Kolbe, 1896) 
 Heteropaussus lujae (Wasmann, 1907) 
 Heteropaussus oberthueri (Wasmann, 1904) 
 Heteropaussus parallelicornis (Wasmann, 1922) 
 Heteropaussus passoscarvalhoi Luna De Carvalho, 1971 
 Heteropaussus quadricollis (Wasmann, 1910) 
 Heteropaussus rossi Luna De Carvalho, 1968 
 Heteropaussus simplex (Reichensperger, 1922) 
 Heteropaussus taprobanensis (Gestro, 1901) 
 Heteropaussus trapezicollis (Wasmann, 1922) 
 Heteropaussus westermanni (Westwood, 1838)

References

Paussinae